NITC may refer to:

 National Institute of Technology Calicut, technical university in India
 National Iranian Tanker Company, Iran's oil tanker company
 New International Trade Crossing, new bridge between Canada and the United States of America

See also
 NIT (disambiguation)
 NTC (disambiguation)
 Technology Business Incubator TBI-NITC, Kozhikode district, India